Thelwell is both a surname and a given name. Notable people with the name include:

Surname:
Alton Thelwell (born 1980), English footballer
Kevin Thelwell (born 1973), English football coach
Lumley Thelwell (fl. 1649–1656), Welsh politician 
Michael Thelwell (born 1939), American novelist and civil rights activist
Norman Thelwell (1923–2004), English cartoonist 
Ryan Thelwell (born 1973), Canadian footballer

Given name:
Thelwell Pike (1866–1957), English footballer

See also
Thelwall
Thirlwall